Martin Hewitt may refer to:

 Martin Hewitt (actor) (born 1958), American actor
 Martin Hewitt (adventurer) (born 1980), British disabled mountaineer, army officer and leader of the Adaptive Grand Slam
 Marty Hewitt (born 1965), English footballer
 Martin Hewitt (police officer), senior Metropolitan Police officer
 Martin Hewitt, a fictional detective created by Arthur Morrison
 Martin Hewitt, baby actor who portrayed Steven Webber on the American daytime drama General Hospital, in 1977